Kang Joon-Ho (Hangul: 강준호, Hanja: 姜俊鎬) (June 22, 1928 – September 24, 1990) was a South Korean amateur boxer who won the bronze medal at the 1952 Summer Olympics. He was born in Haeju, during the Japanese occupation of Korea, and died in Seoul, South Korea. He has multiple grandchildren, including Benjamin Im and Ray Im.

Career
Kang competed for South Korea in the 1952 Summer Olympics held in Helsinki, Finland in the bantamweight event where he finished in third place. In the quarterfinals, he defeated future World Featherweight champion Davey Moore of United States by a 2-1 decision.  He was defeated in the semifinals;  no bronze medal was awarded at the Games, but in 1970, AIBA and IOC awarded all semifinal losers from 1952 to 1968 bronze medals.

Post career
Kang participated in the 1968 Summer Olympics held in Mexico City and the 1972 Summer Olympics held in Munich as the coach of the South Korea national amateur boxing team. He trained numerous professional boxers as well, including former WBC Light Welterweight champion Kim Sang-Hyun and former WBC Flyweight champion Park Chan-Hee.

Results

References

1928 births
1990 deaths
Olympic boxers of South Korea
Olympic bronze medalists for South Korea
Boxers at the 1952 Summer Olympics
Olympic medalists in boxing
South Korean male boxers
Medalists at the 1952 Summer Olympics
Bantamweight boxers
People from Haeju
20th-century South Korean people